Parental Leave Directive 2019 (2019/1158) is a directive in European Union law on work–life balance for parents and carers. It repeals Directive 2010/18/EU. It must be transposed by member states at the latest on 2 August 2022.

Contents
The Work-life Balance Directive maintains the labour rights of the former Parental Leave Directive 2010, in a similar or a modified form, and introduces new rights. Its main provisions are:

introduces paternity leave of at least 10 days
maintains the right of parents to a minimum four months of parental leave, extending from one to two months the period of non-transferable leave
introduces carers' leave of at least five days per year for workers to provide personal care or support to a relative
extends the right to request flexible working arrangements to parents or carers of children under eight years old
maintains the prohibitions on discrimination of parents

References

External links
Text of the Directive

European Union directives
Work–life balance in Europe
Parental leave in Europe